The Miss Connecticut competition is the pageant that selects the representative for the state of Connecticut in the Miss America pageant. Connecticut has won the Miss America crown once (Marian Bergeron, 1933), and is the only New England state which has produced a Miss America.

The current titleholder is Sylvana González of Farmington was crowned on April 9, 2022, at the Mohegan Sun in Uncasville, Connecticut. She competed for the title of Miss America 2023 at the Mohegan Sun in Uncasville, Connecticut.

Results summary 

The following is a visual summary of the past results of Miss Connecticut titleholders at the national Miss America pageants/competitions. The year in parentheses indicates the year of the national competition during which a placement and/or award was garnered, not the year attached to the contestant's state title.

Placements 
 Miss Americas: Marian Bergeron (1933-1934)
 1st runners-up: Bridget Oei (2019)
 2nd runners-up: Tillie Grey (1936)
 4th runners-up: Jillian Duffy (2020)
 Top 10: Billie Turner (1959), Jeanne Caruso (1981), Sylvia Gomes (2000), Tanisha Brito (2003), Kaitlyn Tarpey (2014)
 Top 12: Ruth S. Rubin (1935)
 Top 15: Florence Harriet Green (1926)
 Top 16: Joan Turner (1946), Renee Roy (1951), Acacia Courtney (2015)

Awards

Preliminary awards 

 Preliminary Swimsuit: Margaretta Kling (1935), Carol Jean Norval (1970)
 Preliminary Talent: Renee Roy (1951), Billie Turner (1959), Diana Klug (1960), Dana Daunis (2008)

Non-finalist awards 

 Non-finalist Talent: Susan Lightbown (1958), Carole Gelish (1967), Gunnell Ragone (1969), Maryalice Flineroy (1979), Michele Eaton (1988), Valorie Abate (1993), MaryGrace Santagata (1995), Merissa Starnes (1998), Dana Daunis (2008)

Other awards 

 Miss Congeniality: N/A

Winners

Notes

References

External links 

 Miss Connecticut official website
 Official Blog of Miss Connecticut 2007
 Official Blog of Miss Connecticut 2006

Connecticut culture
Connecticut
Women in Connecticut
Annual events in Connecticut